, born 15 August 1958, is a Japanese filmmaker, best known for low-budget parody films featuring surreal humour and traditional practical effects. 

Kawasaki began his career with mostly self-financed work, including the Den-Ace short films, featuring a parody of kyodai-style Japanese superheroes, before working on Tsuburaya Production's Ultraman Tiga (1996-1997). He had his first hit with The Calamari Wrestler (2004), about a wrestler who inexplicably becomes a giant squid. He followed this up with Executive Koala (2005), about an anthropomorphic koala salaryman who may or may not have murdered his wife, and Kabuto-O Beetle (also 2005), another wrestling-themed movie, this time with a giant stag beetle. In 2006, he released The World Sinks Except Japan, a spoof of Shinji Higuchi's remake of Japan Sinks, and Crab Goalkeeper (also 2006), a film Kawasaki describes as being his Forrest Gump (1994). 

Kawasaki has also directed 2008's Monster X Strikes Back: Attack the G8 Summit, a sequel to the 1967 Shochiku kaiju film The X from Outer Space. While the original, made during the height of Japan's "Kaiju Boom" (1966-1967), is played straight, the sequel is another parody. He has since directed two more kaiju films: Kaiju Mono (2016) and Monster Seafood Wars (2020).

Filmography

As director 

 The Calamari Wrestler (2004)
 Kabuto-O Beetle (2005)
 Executive Koala (2005)
 Crab Goalkeeper (2006)
 The World Sinks Except Japan (2006)
 The Rug Cop (2006)
 Monster X Strikes Back: Attack the G8 Summit (2008)
  (2008)
 Outer Man (2015)
 Kaiju Mono (2016)
 Monster Seafood Wars (2020)
Planet Prince 2021 (2021)

References
Nipponconnection.de 2006: Minoru Kawasaki
Film Threat: Fantasia marches into its final week

 

1958 births
Living people
Japanese film directors